Stepove is a Ukrainian toponym. It is similar to the Russian variant of the word Stepnoye. It is an adjective form of the word step, steppe.

 Stepove, Mykolaiv Oblast, a village in Mykolaiv Raion, Mykolaiv Oblast formerly a German colony of Karlsruhe
 Stepove, Crimea, a village in Crimea, also known in Crimean Tatar language as Qambar
 Stepove, Zaporizhzhia Oblast, a village in Chernihivka Raion, which in 1825 – 1945 was known as Behim-Chokrak after the river
 Stepove, Ternopil Oblast, a village in Ternopil Oblast, which until 1977 was known as Ryhailykha